Alexandre Phliponeau (born 26 January 2000) is a French professional footballer who plays as a defensive midfielder for Annecy.

Career
Phliponeau is a product of the youth academy of Marseille, having joined in 2011. He was promoted to their reserves in 2017 and signed his first professional contract with them on 26 April 2019, signing on for 3 years. He became the record appearance holder for Marseille II with 63 caps when he left in 2021. He joined Sète on loan for the 2021-22 season in the Championnat National where he made 27 appearances. He transferred to the newly promoted club Annecy in the Ligue 2 on 8 June 2022. He debuted with Annecy in a 2–1 loss in the Ligue 2 to Niort on 30 July 2022.

International career
Phliponeau is a youth international for France, having represented the France U18s and France U19s.

References

External links
 
 
 FFF Profile

2000 births
Living people
Footballers from Marseille
French footballers
France youth international footballers
Olympique de Marseille players
FC Sète 34 players
FC Annecy players
Ligue 2 players
Championnat National players
Championnat National 2 players
Association football midfielders